Plymouth Historic District is a national historic district located at Creswell, Washington County, North Carolina.

Overview
The district encompasses 78 contributing buildings and 3 contributing structures in the central business district and surrounding residential sections of Creswell. It was largely developed between about 1874 and 1952 and includes notable examples of Colonial Revival, American Craftsman and Late Victorian style architecture. Notable buildings include the A. G. Walker Store (c. 1877), A. G. Walker House (1878), Hopkins Hotel (1890), Claude T. Spruill House (1890), Alfred Alexander House (1890), Bateman Store, 0. D. Hatfield Store (c. 1910), Christ Episcopal Church (1898), Creswell Baptist Church (c. 1900), Creswell Episcopal Methodist Church (1918), and Davenport's Market (c. 1935).

It was listed on the National Register of Historic Places in 2002.

References

Victorian architecture in North Carolina
Colonial Revival architecture in North Carolina
Buildings and structures in Washington County, North Carolina
National Register of Historic Places in Washington County, North Carolina
Historic districts on the National Register of Historic Places in North Carolina